Gábor Bencsik (born 15 July 1980) is a Hungarian rower. He competed in the men's double sculls event at the 2004 Summer Olympics.

References

External links
 

1980 births
Living people
Hungarian male rowers
Olympic rowers of Hungary
Rowers at the 2004 Summer Olympics
People from Mohács
Sportspeople from Baranya County